Centralia School District 401 is a public school district based in Centralia, Washington

Schools
The school district serves the entirety of Centralia, Washington. There are five elementary schools, one middle school, two high schools and one early learning center for pre-kindergartners. As of 2021, the nine schools in the district are:

 Early Learning Center (pre-kindergarten)
 Ford's Prairie Elementary School (k-6th)
 Washington Elementary School (k-6th)
 Edison Elementary School (k-6th)
 Jefferson Lincoln Elementary (k-6th)
 Oakview Elementary (K-6th)
 Centralia Middle School (7th-8th)
 Centralia High School (9th-12th)
 Futurus High School (9th-12th)

References

External links

School districts in Washington (state)
Education in Lewis County, Washington
School districts established in 1888
1888 establishments in Washington Territory